JJJ is an acronym for Australian radio station Triple J.

JJJ may also refer to:

 JJJ, the production code for the 1971 Doctor Who serial The Dæmons
 J. Jonah Jameson, a fictional character created by Stan Lee and Steve Ditko
 J. Jonah Jameson (film character), the Sam Raimi Spider-Man trilogy and Marvel Cinematic Universe versions
 Jaren Jackson Jr., an American basketball player
 Jingjinji, a metropolitan region of China

See also
 3J (disambiguation)